United Extremadura (EU) is a centre-right regionalist political party in the Spanish Autonomous Community of Extremadura.

References

Centrist parties in Spain
Political parties in Extremadura
Political parties established in 1980
Regionalist parties in Spain